The Holly Grove School was a historic school building in rural White County, Arkansas.  It was located northwest of Bald Knob, north of the junction of Stanley and Honeysuckle Roads.  It was a single story Craftsman-style structure, fashioned out of local fieldstone and brick in 1939 by a crew of the National Youth Administration, a Depression-era jobs program.  It was one of the better examples of NYA construction.

The building was listed on the National Register of Historic Places in 1992.  It was destroyed by fire in 2014.

See also
National Register of Historic Places listings in White County, Arkansas

References

School buildings on the National Register of Historic Places in Arkansas
Buildings and structures in White County, Arkansas
National Register of Historic Places in White County, Arkansas
School buildings completed in 1939
National Youth Administration